Circle Jerk is a 2020 multimedia play by Michael Breslin and Patrick Foley. The play was originally produced by Fake Friends Theater and Media Company, Caroline Gart, and Jeremy O. Harris. It was directed by Rory Pelsue. It featured dramaturgy by Ariel Sibert and performances from the authors and Catherine María Rodríguez.

Summary
It’s winter on Gaymen Island, a summer retreat for the homosexual rich and famous. This off-season, two White gay internet trolls hatch a plot to take back what’s wrongfully theirs. Cancelations, meme schemes, and political and erotica flip flops abound as three actors playing nine parts, play out this chaotic live-streamed descent into the high-energy, quick-change, low-brow pit of the internet.

Accolades
It was a finalist for the Pulitzer Prize for Drama.

See also
Internet culture
Alt-right
Doomscrolling

References

External links
The Queer Review
Homepage
Trailer

LGBT-related plays
Works about the Internet
2021 plays